Israel Sesay (born September 4, 1990) is a Sierra Leone-born American soccer player who currently plays as a defender for the Empire Strykers in the Major Arena Soccer League.

Career

Early life and amateur
Sesay immigrated from his native Sierra Leone with his family at the age of 11, settling in Gaithersburg, Maryland. He attended Quince Orchard High School, where he starred as a forward and helped lead his school to the Regional Quarterfinals in 2005. He also played for local club team Potomac Cougars.

Professional
Sesay came to Los Angeles Galaxy as part of a weighted lottery in August 2007, and made his MLS debut on September 13, 2007, coming on as a substitute for Kyle Martino against Chivas USA; in doing so, Sesay became the youngest player in Los Angeles history to appear in a game, at the age of 17 years and 9 days, breaking the former record held by Guillermo Gonzalez, who was 17 years and 168 days when he made his debut in June 2003.

With the MLS Reserve Division having been scrapped at the end of 2008, Los Angeles loaned Sesay to the Hollywood United Hitmen of the USL Premier Development League and the Cleveland City Stars of the USL First Division for part of the 2009 season, to maintain his match fitness levels. He scored two goals on his Hollywood debut on May 16, 2009, against Bakersfield Brigade.

Sesay signed with the Real Maryland Monarchs of the USL Second Division on April 26, 2010. However, Sesay was still considered to be a part of Los Angeles per the MLS Players Union Player Salaries as of June 14, 2010.

Sesay signed with the Los Angeles Blues of the USL Pro in January 2011. He re-signed with LA for the 2012 season on October 7, 2011.

In October 2013, Sesay signed with the Ontario Fury (now the Empire Strykers) of the Professional Arena Soccer League. In January 2014, he was traded to the Las Vegas Legends. The following season he transferred back to the Ontario Fury.

International
Sesay played in 14 games with the U.S. national Under-17 team between 2006 and 2008, making ten starts and collecting three assists.

References

External links
 MLS player profile

1984 births
Living people
American soccer players
Cleveland City Stars players
Hollywood United Hitmen players
Orange County SC players
LA Galaxy players
Major League Soccer players
Real Maryland F.C. players
Sierra Leonean footballers
Sierra Leonean expatriates in the United States
USL First Division players
USL Second Division players
USL League Two players
USL Championship players
Sierra Leonean emigrants to the United States
United States men's youth international soccer players
Milwaukee Wave players
Major Indoor Soccer League (2008–2014) players
Association football forwards
Major Arena Soccer League players
Ontario Fury players